Bright Angel is a 1990 American drama film directed by Michael Fields, and starring Dermot Mulroney, Lili Taylor, and Sam Shepard. The film follows two teenagers, George and the transient Lucy, who travel from their home in Montana to Wyoming in order to help Lucy's brother escape from jail. It was adapted from a short story in Richard Ford's collection titled Rock Springs.

Although it received some critical acclaim, the film earned only $158,243 at the domestic box office.

Plot
George is a Montana teen whose sanity is deteriorating due to his parents' marital woes. He links up with Lucy, a runaway headed for Wyoming with a dark background who is trying to get her brother out of jail. George tries to help her, but finds himself crossing paths with people even more emotionally disturbed than his mother and father.

Cast
 Dermot Mulroney as George  
 Lili Taylor as Lucy  
 Valerie Perrine as Aileen 
 Bill Pullman as  Bob  
 Mary Kay Place as Judy
 Burt Young as  Art  
 Sam Shepard as  Jack  
 Benjamin Bratt as Claude  
 Delroy Lindo as Harley
 Will Patton as Woody

Production
Principal photography began on July 10, 1989. The film was shot on location in Billings and Broadview, Montana and in Wyoming. Filming wrapped on August 30, 1989.

The shoot was reportedly tumultuous for Lili Taylor, who was nearly fired over aesthetic decisions she'd made in presenting herself as the character. In a 2016 interview, she referred to it as the single most difficult film shoot in her career, stating that she had essentially been fired from the project, but was forced to finish her work on the film.

Critical reception
Roger Ebert of the Chicago Sun-Times enjoyed the film and gave it 3 1/2 stars:

However, reviews such as Kathleen Maher of The Austin Chronicle did not think highly of it, gave it 2 stars and had differing views of the acting:

Soundtrack
"Where Did God Go?" by Jody Alan Sweet
"Too Long Crying" by Jody Alan Sweet
"Cheshire" by Jody Alan Sweet
"Heal Somebody" by Sheryl Crow
"Hung Over Heart" by Jody Alan Sweet

References

External links 

1990 films
Films scored by Christopher Young
Films based on short fiction
Films set in Montana
Films set in Wyoming
Films shot in Montana
Films shot in Wyoming
1990s road movies
American road movies
Films about runaways
1990 directorial debut films
1990 independent films
1990s English-language films
1990s American films